Larsenia is a genus of extremely small sea snails, marine gastropod mollusks or micromollusks in the family Vanikoridae.

Species
Species within the genus Larsenia include:
Larsenia scalaroides Warén, 1989

References

Vanikoridae